is a Japanese slice of life romance shōjo manga series written and illustrated by Ichigo Takano. It was serialized in Shueisha's Bessatsu Margaret manga magazine. It was compiled into 10 volumes published between 2008 and 2011. The manga is published in English by Seven Seas Entertainment.

Characters

Shimana is a teenaged girl who runs away from her home after being torn apart by her father remarrying after her mother's death. She is ashamed of her name, and dislikes the fact that her father remarried, and had another child, Yura. As she runs away from home, she runs into a man dressed in a kimono sleeping in park, who offered her a place to stay in exchange for fulfilling three conditions.

Taiga is the landlord of the house where Zen and Asahi live. He is seen wearing a kimono, and like his father, is a prosecutor. Taiga offers Shimana a place to live after falling asleep in a park after a night of drinking.

Zen is a classmate of Shimana who lives in Taiga's house. He is often seen obsessing over pandas and is a fan of kung-fu.

Asahi is a student who attends the same school as Shimana, and is one year senior to her. He is seen at school wearing glasses and reading books, however, changes in appearance when he is not in this state of studying. He has a crush on his childhood friend Manami.

Media

Manga
The original series is written and illustrated by Ichigo Takano, and was serialized in Shueisha's Bessatsu Margaret from 13 October 2007 to 11 August 2011. The series was later published into tankōbon volumes, with the first volume being released on 25 March 2008, and the final volume being released on 25 November 2011. The series was later redrawn by Takano, with the redrawn series published by Futabasha. Futabasha published the redrawn series from 12 December 2015 to 28 April 2017.

The series is licensed in English in North America by Seven Seas Entertainment, who are publishing the Futabasha version of the series. The first volume was published on 2 May 2017.

Volume list

Reception
Volume 8 reached the 13th place on the weekly Oricon manga chart and, as of January 30, 2011, has sold 41,147 copies; volume 9 reached the 14th place and, as of May 29, 2011, has sold 42,809 copies; volume 10 reached the 27th place and, as of December 4, 2011, has sold 66,309 copies.

On manga-news.com, it has a staff grade of 13.67 out of 20. On Manga Sanctuary, it has a staff grade from one staff member of 7 out of 10. On planetebd.com, it has a staff grade of "good, nice".

See also
Orange, another manga series by the same author

References

External links
Dreamin' Sun at Futabasha (in Japanese)

Futabasha manga
Romance anime and manga
Seven Seas Entertainment titles
Seinen manga
Shōjo manga
Shueisha manga
Slice of life anime and manga